The 1981 Avon Championships of Seattle  was a women's tennis tournament played on indoor carpet courts at the Seattle Center Coliseum  in Seattle, Washington in the United States that was part of the 1981 Avon Championships Circuit. It was the fifth edition of the tournament and was held from February 23 through March 1, 1981. Sixth-seeded Sylvia Hanika won the singles title and earned $24,000 first-prize money.

Finals

Singles
 Sylvia Hanika defeated  Barbara Potter 6–2, 6–4
 It was Hanika's 1st singles title of the year and the 2nd of her career.

Doubles
 Rosie Casals /  Wendy Turnbull defeated  Sue Barker /  Ann Kiyomura 6–4, 6–1

Prize money

Notes

References

External links
 International Tennis Federation (ITF) tournament edition details

Avon Championships of Seattle
Virginia Slims of Seattle
Virginia Slims of Seattle
Virginia Slims of Seattle
Virginia Slims of Seattle
Tennis in Washington (state)